Apagomera aereiventris is a species of beetle in the family Cerambycidae. It was described by Tippmann in 1960. It is known from Bolivia.

References

Hemilophini
Beetles described in 1960